The Highlanders is the completely missing fourth serial of the fourth season in the British science fiction television series Doctor Who, which was first broadcast in four weekly parts from 17 December 1966 to 7 January 1967.

In this serial, the Doctor (Patrick Troughton) and his travelling companions Ben (Michael Craze) and Polly (Anneke Wills) arrive in the Scottish Highlands in 1746, just after the Battle of Culloden. They gain the trust of the Jacobites, but their friendliness gets them into serious trouble with the Redcoats led by Lieutenant Algernon Ffinch (Michael Elwyn). This serial is the first appearance of Frazer Hines as companion-to-be Jamie McCrimmon.

Although audio recordings, still photographs, and clips of the story exist, no episodes of this serial are known to have survived.

Plot

Following the Battle of Culloden, the British army is triumphant over the rebel forces of Bonnie Prince Charlie. When the TARDIS arrives, the Second Doctor, Ben and Polly encounter fleeing Scots rebels and are taken prisoner by them. They all hide in a deserted cottage with the Laird Colin McLaren, who has been badly wounded; his daughter Kirsty; his piper Jamie McCrimmon; and his son Alexander, who dies defending them from a patrol of English soldiers mopping up survivors. The patrol leader, Lt. Algernon Ffinch, is an ineffectual fop, but his Sergeant is more forceful and takes the Doctor, Jamie, Ben and the Laird to be hanged. But Polly and Kirsty manage to slip away.

The two women hide in a cave, then an animal pit, from Lt. Ffinch, who believes the Prince to be one of them following the rumour that he fled the battlefield as a woman. Eventually Ffinch finds them, but they trick him and steal his money. Later in Inverness, the nearest major town to Culloden, they run into him again and use his previous foolishness to blackmail him.

Elsewhere on the battlefield, the Royal Commissioner of Prisons, a shady character called Grey, plots to enslave any highlanders still alive and ship them to the colonies. He makes contact with an unscrupulous sea captain called Trask who agrees to use his ship “The Annabelle” for this. Amongst the prisoners he identifies for sale are the Doctor, Jamie, Ben, and the Laird. They are taken to the prison in Inverness but the Doctor cons his way out, and overpowers Grey and his secretary Perkins to make his escape. Grey is freed by Trask, who reports that the transportation plan has begun and arranges for a number of prisoners, including Jamie, Ben and the Laird, to be transferred to the ship. The prisoners learn that they are being sold as slaves but most accept this fate, believing seven years indentured labour to be better than the gallows. Only Ben, Jamie, the Laird and one of his friends, Willie Mackay, refuse to sign. When Ben attacks Grey, Trask has him thrown into the sea at the end of a rope.

The Doctor has adopted the guises of both a kitchen maid and a German man, and uses these identities to move about freely. He is reunited with Polly and Kirsty, then with Ben, who has swum to safety. The Doctor returns to Grey, with a concocted story about Bonnie Prince Charlie’s ring, claiming to know the fugitive Prince’s whereabouts. He names the prince as the piper Jamie. The ruse works, distracting Grey and Trask while the girls free the prisoners and supply them with arms for an uprising. When Grey and Trask check on Jamie they are captured by the armed highlanders, and a revolt begins. Trask flees, is wounded and thrown overboard. Willie Mackay takes control of the "Annabelle" and determines to sail her to freedom in France, happy to accept Perkins as a volunteer for this journey, along with Kirsty and her father.

The Doctor, Ben and Polly return to the town, using Grey as a hostage to ensure their freedom of movement, and are joined by Jamie, who has decided to stay and help them find the TARDIS. The party loses Grey but finds Ffinch, whom they force to help them return to Culloden. Grey reaches the cottage where he first met the Doctor, and brings with him a patrol of soldiers. Ffinch arrests Grey for the transportation scheme. The solicitor has lost the paperwork (thanks to the Doctor) and is unable to prove the legality of his plans. Thanked by a kiss from Polly, Lt. Ffinch departs. The Doctor, Ben and Polly return to the TARDIS and invite their new friend, Jamie McCrimmon, on board. He nervously accepts.

Production

 Episode is missing

The script was commissioned from Elwyn Jones, who proved ultimately too busy to actually write it. Script editor Gerry Davis stepped in to write the serial. Jones and Davis shared on-screen credit although Jones did no work on the script. The working title for this story was Culloden; however, a few years previously the BBC had aired a docudrama titled Culloden which resulted in the changing of the name of this story.

The Highlanders was the last purely historical story until Black Orchid in 1982. Patrick Troughton encouraged the move away from historical stories, according to his son Michael, out of an interest in exploring "real science in drama" as well as a desire to further distinguish his era from that of the previous Doctor, William Hartnell.

Producer Innes Lloyd and script editor Gerry Davis were initially uncertain whether the character of Jamie would work as an ongoing character, and although Frazer Hines' contract had an option for three more serials an ending was filmed with Jamie staying behind when the TARDIS departed. Hines' performance during shooting ultimately convinced them that the character had potential and the ending was re-shot. His popularity with the public ensured Jamie became a longtime member of the TARDIS crew.

While still an actor in the early 1960s this serial's director, Hugh David, had been considered for the role of the First Doctor but being only 38 years old at the time was deemed to be too young by the series' original producer Verity Lambert.

For the Battle of Culloden scenes, the stand-in location of Frensham Ponds in Surrey was used.

The Highlanders was the first Doctor Who serial to have its videotapes wiped, which occurred on 9 March 1967, just two months after its broadcast. Only brief clips from episode 1 survive.

Cast notes
William Dysart later appeared in The Ambassadors of Death (1970). Hannah Gordon provided the voice of Skagra's ship in the Big Finish Productions version of Shada. Peter Welch was later seen in The Android Invasion (1975). David Garth went on to play the Time Lord in Terror of the Autons (1971).

Commercial releases

In print

A novelisation of this serial, written by Gerry Davis, was published by Target Books in August 1984.

Home media
As with all missing episodes of Doctor Who, full off-air audio recordings exist due to contemporary fan efforts. In August 2000 these were released on CD, accompanied by linking narration from Frazer Hines. A few brief video clips survive, and were released on the Lost in Time DVD set in 2004. A new unabridged reading of the novelisation of The Highlanders was released in September 2012 read by Anneke Wills (who played Polly in the original TV episodes), with original sound design.

Charles Norton, director of several animated reconstructions, noted in 2019 that an animated version of The Highlanders was considered, but due to the difficulty in animating the clothing and locations, the team instead went ahead with The Macra Terror.

References

Bibliography

External links

Photonovel of The Highlanders on the BBC website
Doctor Who Locations – The Highlanders

Target novelisation

Doctor Who missing episodes
Second Doctor serials
Doctor Who historical serials
Doctor Who serials novelised by Gerry Davis
1966 British television episodes
1967 British television episodes
Jacobite rising of 1745
Television episodes set in Scotland
Fiction set in the 1740s
Television episodes set in the 18th century